In geometry, a compound of two tetrahedra is constructed by two overlapping tetrahedra, usually implied as regular tetrahedra.

Stellated octahedron 

There is only one uniform polyhedral compound, the stellated octahedron, which has octahedral symmetry, order 48. It has a regular octahedron core, and shares the same 8 vertices with the cube.

If the edge crossings were treated as their own vertices, the compound would have identical surface topology to the rhombic dodecahedron; were face crossings also considered edges of their own the shape would effectively become a nonconvex triakis octahedron.

Lower symmetry constructions
There are lower symmetry variations on this compound, based on lower symmetry forms of the tetrahedron. 

 A facetting of a rectangular cuboid, creating compounds of two tetragonal or two rhombic disphenoids, with a bipyramid or rhombic fusil cores. This is first in a set of uniform compound of two antiprisms.
 A facetting of a trigonal trapezohedron creates a compound of two right triangular pyramids with a triangular antiprism core. This is first in a set of compounds of two pyramids positioned as point reflections of each other.

Other compounds
If two regular tetrahedra are given the same orientation on the 3-fold axis, a different compound is made, with D3h, [3,2] symmetry, order 12.

Other orientations can be chosen as 2 tetrahedra within the compound of five tetrahedra and compound of ten tetrahedra the latter of which can be seen as a hexagrammic pyramid:

See also 
 Compound of cube and octahedron
 Compound of dodecahedron and icosahedron
 Compound of small stellated dodecahedron and great dodecahedron
 Compound of great stellated dodecahedron and great icosahedron

References
 Cundy, H. and Rollett, A. "Five Tetrahedra in a Dodecahedron". §3.10.8 in Mathematical Models, 3rd ed. Stradbroke, England: Tarquin Pub., pp. 139-141, 1989.

External links 
 
 Compounds of Polyhedra VRML model: 

Polyhedral compounds